Red spot or redspot may refer to:

 Great Red Spot, a persistent anticyclonic vortex on the south border of the South Equatorial belt of Jupiter
 Red Spot Jr., a red storm in Jupiter's southern hemisphere similar to, though smaller than, the Great Red Spot
 Red Spot (G.I. Joe), a fictional character in the G.I. Joe universe
 The Red Spot, a German-Japanese film
 Zesius chrysomallus, a butterfly commonly called the redspot
Red Spot, an Irish whiskey.

See also
 Port-wine stain